Mélange is a mixture of nitrates and organic matter and a liquid oxidant rocket fuel component that was "used during the Soviet era as one of two components to propel small and medium range missiles." It is a highly toxic and aggressive mixture of acids, which can ignite in contact with combustibles. When it decomposes it becomes unstable, producing nitric acid and nitrogen tetroxide.

Some former-Soviet countries have large quantities. Ukraine, for example, had 16,000 tonnes, which the OSCE has helped process. NATO has successfully processed mélange in Uzbekistan. Most states are eliminating their mélange, either by neutralizing it or transferring it to specialized chemical facilities. The substance can be processed into chemical products for civilian use, such as agricultural fertilizers.

References

Rocket fuels
Rocketry articles needing major expansion